The Metropolitan Borough of Rochdale is a metropolitan borough of Greater Manchester in North West England. It is named after its largest town, Rochdale, The borough covers other outlying towns and villages with a population of 206,500 at the 2011 census. It is the ninth-largest district by population in Greater Manchester.

History
The borough was formed in 1974 as part of the provisions of the Local Government Act 1972 and is an amalgamation of six former local government districts. It was originally proposed that the borough include the neighbouring town of Bury and disclude Middleton; Bury however went on to form the administrative centre for the adjacent Metropolitan Borough of Bury. The borough was formed by a merger of the former county borough of Rochdale and from the administrative county of Lancashire, the municipal boroughs of Heywood and Middleton, along with the urban districts of Littleborough, Milnrow and Wardle.The borough lies mostly within the historic county of Lancashire but a small part lies in the former West Riding of Yorkshire. Prior to its creation, it was suggested that the metropolitan borough be named Chadwick (with reference to Sir Edwin Chadwick), but this was rejected in favour of Rochdale.

Geography

The borough lies directly north-northeast of the City of Manchester, to the east of the Metropolitan Borough of Bury, to the north of the Metropolitan Borough of Oldham and partly to the east of the county of West Yorkshire bordering near to the Metropolitan Borough of Calderdale and the Lancashire borough of Rossendale is to the northwest. There are some rural parts and urban parts of the district including Blackstone Edge and the Pennine hills which form part of the rural areas of the borough. The more urban areas centre around the town and neighbouring boroughs of Bury, Oldham and Manchester. The town of Middleton is contiguous with the northeastern suburbs of Manchester and the towns of Chadderton, Failsworth and Oldham. The towns of Heywood, Littleborough and Milnrow form an urban area with Rochdale.

Towns, villages and suburbs

Aside from the aforementioned town of Rochdale, other towns in the borough include Heywood, Littleborough and Milnrow. Villages, hamlets and suburbs of the borough include Balderstone, Birtle, Clough, Newhey, Summit and Wardle.

Demographics

Ethnicity (2021 Census)
All residents	223,773	 - 100.0
White - 	165,485	 - 74.0
English/Welsh/Scottish/Northern Irish/British - 	156,669	 - 70.0
Irish - 	1,735	 - 0.8
Gypsy or Irish Traveller - 	194 - 	0.1
Roma - 	163	 - 0.1
Other White - 	6,724 	 - 3.0
Mixed/multiple ethnic groups - 	5,284	 - 2.4
White and Black Caribbean - 	1,303	 - 0.6
White and Black African - 	1,210	 - 0.5
White and Asian - 	1,736	 - 0.8
Other Mixed - 	1,035	 - 0.5
Asian/Asian British - 	41,406	 - 18.4
Indian - 	1,190	 - 0.5
Pakistani - 	30,525	 - 13.6
Bangladeshi - 	5,170	 - 2.3
Chinese - 	867	 - 0.4
Other Asian - 	3,654	 - 1.6
Black/African/Caribbean/Black British - 	7,927	 - 3.6
African	 - 6,476	 - 2.9
Caribbean	 - 440	 - 0.2
Other Black	 - 1,011	 - 0.5
Other ethnic group	 - 3,669	 - 1.7
Arab	 - 815	 - 0.4
Any other ethnic group	 - 2,854	 - 1.3

Religion

The following table shows the religious identity of residents residing in Rochdale.

Population change
The table below details the population change since 1801, including the percentage change since the last available census data. Although the Metropolitan Borough of Rochdale has only existed 1974, figures have been generated by combining data from the towns, villages, and civil parishes that would later be constituent parts of the borough.

Twin towns
The Metropolitan Borough of Rochdale has formal twinning arrangements with six places. Three were originally twinned with a place within the Metropolitan Borough boundaries prior to its creation in 1974.

Freedom of the Borough
The following people and military units have received the Freedom of the Borough of Rochdale.

Individuals
 Dame Gracie Fields: 6 May 1937.
 Sir Cyril Smith: November 1992. (This honour was revoked by a unanimous vote of the Rochdale Borough Council on 18 October 2018).
 Jim Callaghan: 3 April 1996.
 Lance Corporal Stephen Shaw : 26 May 2013.
 Rt. Hon. Lord Barnett: 23 April 2014.
 Julie Goodyear: 5 October 2017.
 Keira Walsh: 7 October 2022.

Military units
 The Lancashire Fusiliers: 5 June 1947.
 The Royal Regiment of Fusiliers: 4 March 1978.
 HMS Middleton, RN: 20 May 1992.

See also

Rochdale Metropolitan Borough Council elections
List of people from Rochdale
List of schools in Rochdale

References

Notes

Bibliography

External links

www.rochdale.gov.uk, Rochdale Council.
www.investinrochdale.co.uk/, Rochdale Development Agency - information on the borough, its economy and regeneration.
www.pennineland.co.uk Development Arm of Rochdale Development Agency (RDA) Uniting Private & Public Sector to support the Regeneration of Rochdale Borough.
www.statsandmaps.co.uk Stats and Maps is the Rochdale Borough statistics and maps website. It is a shared evidence based that provides quick and easy on-line access to data, information, and intelligence about the borough of Rochdale, and aims to meet the needs of the local community, LSP partners, and the general public.

 
 
Metropolitan boroughs of Greater Manchester